In the United Kingdom, military conscription has existed for two periods in modern times. The first was from 1916 to 1920, and the second from 1939 to 1960. The last conscripted soldiers left the service in 1963. It was legally designated as "Military Service" from 1916 to 1920, and as "National Service" from 1939 to 1960. However, between 1939 and 1948, it was often referred to as "War Service" in documents relating to National Insurance and pension provision.

First World War

Conscription during the First World War began when the British government passed the Military Service Act in January 1916. The act specified that single men aged 18 to 40 years old were liable to be called up for military service unless they were widowed with children, or were ministers of a religion.  There was a system of tribunals to adjudicate upon claims for exemption upon the grounds of performing civilian work of national importance, domestic hardship, health, and conscientious objection. The law went through several changes before the war ended. Married men were exempt in the original Act, although this was changed in May 1916. The age limit was also eventually raised to 51 years old. Recognition of work of national importance also diminished. In the last year of the war there was support for the conscription of clergy, though this was not enacted. Conscription lasted until mid-1919.

Due to the political situation in Ireland, conscription was never applied there; only in Great Britain (England, Scotland, and Wales).

Second World War

Conscription legislation lapsed in 1920. However, as a result of the deteriorating international situation and the rise of Nazi Germany, the Secretary of State for War,  Leslie Hore-Belisha, persuaded the cabinet of Neville Chamberlain to introduce a limited form of conscription on 27 April 1939. The Military Training Act was passed the following month. Only single men 20 to 22 years old were liable to be called up, and they were to be known as "militiamen" to distinguish them from the regular army. To emphasise this distinction, each man was issued with a suit in addition to a uniform. The intention was for the first intake to undergo six months of basic training before being discharged into an active reserve. They would then be recalled for short training periods and attend an annual camp.

At the outbreak of war, on 3 September 1939, the Military Training Act was overtaken by the National Service act. The first intake was absorbed into the army. This act imposed a liability to conscription to all men aged 18 to 41 years who were living in Great Britain. Men could be rejected for medical reasons, and those engaged in vital industries or occupations were "reserved" at a particular age beyond which no one in that job would be enlisted. For example, lighthouse keepers and police officers were "reserved" at 18 years old. From 1943, some conscripts were directed into the British coal mining industry and become known as the "Bevin Boys". Provision was also made for conscientious objectors, who were required to justify their position to a tribunal, with power to allocate the applicant to one of three categories: unconditional exemption; exemption conditional upon performing specified civilian work (frequently farming, forestry or menial hospital work); exemption from only combatant service, meaning that the objector had to serve in the specially created Non-Combatant Corps or in some other non-combatant unit such as the Royal Army Medical Corps.

By 1942 all male British subjects between 18 and 51 years old and all females 20 to 30 years old resident in Great Britain and the Isle of Man were liable to be called up, with some exemptions:
 British subjects from outside Great Britain and the Isle of Man who had lived in the country for less than two years
 Police, medical and prison workers 
 Northern Irish
 Students
 Persons employed by the government of any country of the British Empire except the United Kingdom
 Clergy of any denomination
 Those who were blind or had mental disorders
 Married women
 Women who had one or more children 14 years old or younger living with them. This included their own children, legitimate or illegitimate, stepchildren, and adopted children, as long as the child was adopted before 18 December 1941.

Pregnant women were not exempted, but in practice were not called up.

Men under 20 years old were initially not liable to be sent overseas, but this exemption was lifted by 1942. People called up before they were 51 years old but who reached their 51st birthday during their service were liable to serve until the end of the war. People who had retired, resigned or been dismissed from the forces before the war were liable to be called back if they had not reached 51 years of age.

Britain did not completely demobilise in 1945, as conscription continued after the war. Those already in the armed forces were given a release class determined by length of service and age. In practice, releases began in June 1945, and the last of the wartime conscripts had been released by 1949. However, urgently needed men, particularly those in the building trades, were released in 1945, although some restrictions on their immediate employment were supposed to be enforced. All women were released at the end of the war.

After 1945

National Service as peacetime conscription was formulated by the National Service Act 1948. From 1 January 1949, healthy males 17 to 21 years old were required to serve in the armed forces for 18 months, and remain on the reserve list for four years. They could be recalled to their units for up to 20 days for no more than three occasions during these four years. Men were exempt from National Service if they worked in one of the three "essential services": coal mining, farming, and the merchant navy for a period of eight years. If they quit early, they were subject to being called up. Exemption continued for conscientious objectors, with the same tribunal system and categories.

In October 1950, in response to the British involvement in the Korean War, the service period was extended to two years; in compensation, the reserve period was reduced by six months. National Servicemen who showed promise could be commissioned as officers. National Service personnel were used in combat operations, including the Malayan Emergency, the Cyprus Emergency, in Kenya against the Mau Mau Uprising, and the Korean War, where conscripts to the Gloucestershire Regiment took part in the last stand during the Battle of the Imjin River. In addition, National Servicemen served in the Suez Crisis in 1956.

During the 1950s there was a prohibition on serving members of the armed forces standing for election to parliament. A few National Servicemen stood for election in the 1951 and 1955 general elections in order to be dismissed from service.

National Service ended gradually from 1957. It was decided that those born on or after 1 October 1939 would not be required, but conscription continued for those born earlier whose call-up had been delayed for any reason. In November 1960 the last conscripted men entered service, as call-ups formally ended on 31 December 1960, and the last conscripted servicemen left the armed forces in May 1963.

British overseas territories

The British overseas territory of Bermuda was the last jurisdiction to abolish conscription.

Service in the old Bermuda Militia from 1612 to 1816, as in the Militia of the Kingdom of England (including the Principality of Wales) and subsequently the English and Welsh Militia of the Kingdom of Great Britain, had been compulsory, with all able-bodied, military-aged males, whether free, indentured, or enslaved, liable. The Militia was divided into nine companies, one for each parish (collectively forming a battalion under a lieutenant-colonel), and were embodied annually for training, or as required by war or emergency. Volunteers, organised under appointed Captains of Forts, also manned fortified coastal artillery batteries to maintain a standing defence against enemy vessels or landing parties. This Militia was raised under acts of the colonial Parliament of Bermuda, which required periodic renewal. Bermuda had received its first regular (English Army) unit (an Independent Company, detached from the 2nd Regiment of Foot) in 1701. This was withdrawn in 1763, following the Seven Years' War, and replaced by a company detached from the 9th Regiment of Foot in Florida and a detachment from the Independent Company of the Bahamas, but these were withdrawn in 1768, leaving only the militia and volunteer gunners. Two companies of the invalid Royal Garrison Battalion were posted to Bermuda during the American War of Independence, but this unit was disbanded at Bermuda in 1783.

Regular British Army infantry (a detachment of the 47th Regiment of Foot) was detached to Bermuda to re-establish the Bermuda Garrison in 1793 as the French Revolution led to war between Britain and France. This unit was joined in 1794 by a company Invalid Royal Artillery from the Board of Ordnance Military Corps (and not at that time part of the British Army). Royal Engineers officers had already been posted to Bermuda to survey the defences and oversee their improvement. There were no Royal Sappers and Miners present, however, until the 19th century, and civilians (including retired soldiers) were hired locally to carry out the construction work. At the same time, the Royal Navy established in Bermuda what was to become the Royal Naval Dockyard, Bermuda and an Admiralty House, and the primary role of the growing military garrison became the protection of the main base of the Royal Navy's North America and West Indies Station as the British Government came to view Fortress Bermuda more as a base than a colony. The build-up of the regular military forces led to the Parliament of Bermuda allowing the Militia Act to lapse after 1816 as the reserve forces were perceived as an unnecessary expense (the Militia in the United Kingdom was also allowed to become a paper tiger after the conclusion of the Napoleonic Wars and the American War of 1812, and was not restored until the 1850s, from which time it recruited only volunteers; the Volunteer Force was raised at the same time to boost Britain's defences). The British Government spent the next eight decades unsuccessfully asking, pleading and cajoling the local government to restore the militia until the requirement of consent for American investment into the Princess Hotel and the dredging of the channel into the St. George's Harbour led the local parliament to pass new militia and volunteer acts in 1892. During the interim, Bermudian volunteers had been recruited for local-service only into the regular army and the Board of Ordnance Military Corps, under terms of service similar to those of the old militia.

From 1894, recruitment into the new part-time military reserves raised under the 1892 acts had originally followed the post-1850s practices in England for the Militia of the United Kingdom, in which soldiers voluntarily enlisted for six years (embodied for the duration of wars or emergencies, or otherwise only for annual training), and the Volunteer Force, in which part-time soldiers served voluntarily and could quit their service with 14 days' notice, except while embodied for training, war, or national emergency. The Militia, Volunteer force, and Yeomanry were merged into the Territorial Force (later renamed the Territorial Army) in Britain in 1907–1908, with the introduction of terms of service (specific lengths of service for which volunteers enlisted), but this did not occur in Bermuda until the 1920s (1921 for the BVRC and 1928 for the BMA, as post-war reductions of the British Government's defence budget let to the reduction of the regular army components of the Bermuda Garrison, with the reserve units taking on greater responsibilities). Conscription into the Bermuda Militia Artillery and the Bermuda Volunteer Rifle Corps was discussed during the First World War, but had not been put into place before the cessation of hostilities. It was introduced during the Second World War, with conscripts serving full-time for the duration in the BMA, BVRC, the Bermuda Volunteer Engineers (raised in 1931), or the Bermuda Militia Infantry (raised in 1939). Those unable to serve full-time were directed into the Bermuda Home Guard (raised for the duration of the war). Although conscription ended with the war, a shortfall of volunteers led to its reintroduction to the BVRC in 1957 (when the regular army components of the Bermuda Garrison were withdrawn, leaving only the two territorials in Bermuda) and the BMA in 1960. Since the two units were amalgamated in 1965, conscription was retained until July 2018, making the Royal Bermuda Regiment the last conscripted force serving under the British Crown.

Support for reintroduction of conscription
In 2015 Prince Harry made a call for bringing back conscription.  Following the launch of his 2009 film Harry Brown,  English actor Michael Caine called for the reintroduction of national service in the UK to give young people "a sense of belonging rather than a sense of violence."

In popular culture

Film and TV 
The following productions have content inspired by British conscription or National Service:

Queen and Country   (2014) Character undergoes National Service training prior to Korean War.
 Privates   (2013) Mini-series about soldiers at an Army base.
 Father Brown, Series 3, The Sign of the Broken Sword.  (2013)  Crime-drama set on a 1950s Army base.
 Lads' Army     (2002–2006)  Reality TV series.
The Krays  (1990) Barrack room scene.
 Stand Up, Virgin Soldiers   (1977)   Based on the novel of the same name.
 Get Some In!     (1975–1978) TV sitcom set in an RAF base.
Chips with Everything (1975)  BBC remake of the 1963 production of the same name, it relates to the RAF.
Monty Python's Flying Circus (1970). The Piranha Brothers were said to be "found by an Army Board as too unstable even for National Service."
 The Virgin Soldiers   (1969)  Based on the novel of the same name.
Chips with Everything (1963)  BBC production based on the play of the same name, it relates to the RAF.
Idol on Parade (1959)  Character undergoes two years National Service.
 Carry On Sergeant       (1958)   Comedy film.
 The Army Game         (1957–1961)  TV sitcom contemporary with National Service.
 Private's Progress  (1956)  Comedy film.
Down Among the Z Men (1952) Comedy film featuring The Goon Show comics.
The Way Ahead (1944) Film follows a group of men called up to fight for the British Army in North Africa.
Lipstick on Your Collar (1993) TV series by Dennis Potter featuring National Servicemen working as Russian translators at the time of the Suez Crisis

Literature 

Baxter, D. Two Years to Do, 1954. Memoir.
Camp, W. Idol on Parade, 1958. Fiction. 
Sillitoe, Alan Saturday Night and Sunday Morning, 1958. Fiction. 
Ions, E. Call to Arms: Interlude with the Military, 1972. Memoir.
Lodge, D. Ginger, You're Barmy, 1962. Fiction.
Thomas, L. The Virgin Soldiers, 1966. Fiction.
Thomas, L. Stand Up, Virgin Soldiers, 1975. Fiction.
Weston, P. A Stranger to Khaki: Memoir of a National Service Officer, 1997. Memoir.
Johnson B S. All Bull: The National Servicemen, 1973. Accounts by servicemen.
Hickman, Tom. The Call Up: A History of National Service, 2005. Non-fiction.
Royle, Trevor, National Service: The Best Years Of Their Lives, 2002. Accounts by servicemen.

See also

Military service
Recruit training
Alternative service
Class Z Reserve
Court-martial
Demobilisation of the British Armed Forces after the Second World War
Impressment

References

Further reading
Broad, R; Conscription in Britain 1939–64, 2006.
Broad, R; The Radical General: Sir Robert Adam and Britain's New Model Army, 2013.
Carradice, P; The Call Up,2016.
Chambers, P; (ed), Called Up, 1955.
Coates, B; National Service Fifty Years On,2014.
Doyle, P; National Service, 2012.
Hickman, T; The Call Up: A History of National Service 1947–1963, 2004.
Johnson, B.S; All Bull: The National Servicemen, 1973.
McCutcheon, C; (ed), The National Serviceman's Handbook, 2007.
Paul, E; National Service, 2012
Pollard, R; You and the Call Up, 1942.
Royle, T; National Service: The Best Years of Their Lives, 2002.
Shindler, C; National Service, 2012.
Thorne, T;  Brasso, Blanco and Bull, 2012.
Vinen, R; National Service: A Generation in Uniform, 2014

External links
British Armed Forces National Service Stories
British Armed Forces National Service Stories – Bill Wyman
National Service Memoirs
Parliamentary Archives: WW1 Conscription
BBC History – Conscription Introduced
BBC History – The Peacetime Conscripts: National Service in the Post-war Years
BBC History – WW2 People's War – Fact File : Reserved Occupations

 
Public policy in the United Kingdom
British Army recruitment
United Kingdom